Eberhardzell is a town in the district of Biberach in Baden-Württemberg in Germany.

Culture and Attractions
 Parish church St. Maria
 Clergy house
 Ratusz from 1746
 Castle Heinrichsburg

Notable people 
 Gebhard Müller (1900-1990), German politician (CDU)

References

Biberach (district)
Württemberg